Padraig O'Neill is a Gaelic footballer from County Kildare. He plays for the Kildare senior inter-county football team and for his club St Laurence's.

References

External links
 

Year of birth missing (living people)
Living people
Kildare inter-county Gaelic footballers